Antimargarita is a genus of sea snails, marine gastropod mollusks in the family Margaritidae.

Species
Species within the genus Antimargarita include:
 Antimargarita bentarti Aldea, Zelaya & Troncoso, 2009
 Antimargarita dulcis (E.A. Smith, 1907)
 Antimargarita maoria Dell, 1995
 Antimargarita powelli Aldea, Zelaya & Troncoso, 2009
  Antimargarita smithiana (Hedley, 1916)
Species brought into synonymy 
 Antimargarita smithiana (Hedley, 1916): synonym of Submargarita smithiana Hedley, 1916
 Antimargarita thielei (Hedley, 1916): synonym of Falsimargarita thielei (Hedley, 1916)

References

 Aldea C., Zelaya D.G. & Troncoso J.S. (2009) Two new trochids of the genus Antimargarita (Gastropoda: Vetigastropoda: Trochidae) from the Bellingshausen Sea and South Shetland Islands, Antarctica. Polar Biology 32:417–426

 
Margaritidae